The City of Paris may refer to:

Paris, capital of France
La Ville de Paris, a 1910-12 painting by Robert Delaunay
La Ville de Paris, a dirigible constructed in 1906

Passenger liners
SS City of Paris (1865)
SS City of Paris (1888) 
SS City of Paris (1920)

Other uses
City of Paris Dry Goods Co., a former store in San Francisco (1850-1976)
City of Paris (Los Angeles), a department store 
Ville de Paris (department store), Los Angeles

See also
Paris (disambiguation)